Brookpark is a station on the RTA Red Line located on the borders of Brook Park and Cleveland, Ohio, USA. It is located along Brookpark Road (Ohio State Route 17), west of the intersection of Henry Ford Boulevard (Ohio State Route 291) and east of the intersection of the Berea Freeway (Ohio State Route 237).

It is the westernmost station on the RTA Rapid Transit that includes free parking and it is the second busiest station on the RTA Rapid Transit, after Tower City.

History

The four-mile extension of the CTS Rapid Transit from West Park station to Cleveland Hopkins International Airport was opened in November 1968, but the Brookpark Station was not opened when this extension was opened. The station opened the following spring on April 20. The station lobby and parking lot were originally located on the northeast side of the tracks and connected to the platform by a tunnel extending under the eastbound track and the adjacent tracks of Norfolk Southern.

In 2000, RTA announced plans for a $7.5 million renovation of the station similar to other Red Line stations that have been or are being rebuilt. The plans called for closing the present station and building a temporary station on the other side of the tracks. The temporary station was erected and the old station closed, but further plans for a new station were sidetracked.

In 2005, the RTA Board approved a letter of intent to build a permanent station as a part of a larger transit-oriented development which includes hotels, restaurants and other commercial venues.
The agreement provided for completion of the new station in three years, but due to the poor economy, this development has not yet been realized.

In March 2011, early stages of a design for the renovation of the station were approved and in October, 2011, RTA announced that the agency had received federal funds to repave the parking lot and bus station pavement.

A $1.2 million federal stimulus grant paid for a completely new station. The upgrades included rebuilt entrances, a new platform, a new tunnel under the tracks to remove the grade crossing, better lighting, landscaping and sidewalk improvements, better waiting areas, and improvements to the parking area to improve car and pedestrian mobility. The new eastern entrance and rail platform opened to the public on April 10, 2017.

Station layout

Brookpark has a single island platform for the Red Line. At the south end of the platform is an enclosed waiting area and a staircase and elevator. The island platform is accessed by a tunnel underneath the tracks, connecting it to both the eastern and western parking lots on either side of the station. All buses serving Brookpark stop at the bus bay on the eastern side of the station.

Notable places nearby
 Cleveland Engine

Gallery

References

External links

Red Line (RTA Rapid Transit)
Railway stations in the United States opened in 1969
1969 establishments in Ohio